Jaunsari  is a Western Pahari language of northern India spoken by the Jaunsari people in the Chakrata and Kalsi blocks of Dehradun district in the Garhwal region of Uttarakhand state.

The dialects of Jaunsari share about 60% of their basic vocabulary with each of the neighbouring varieties of Bangani, Jaunpuri, Nagpuriya and Sirmauri.

Script 

Jaunsari was historically written in Jaunsari Script . The Devanagari script is being used these days in certain works.

Status 
The language has no official status. According to the United Nations Education, Scientific and Cultural Organisation (UNESCO), the language is of definitely endangered category, i.e. many Jaunsari children are not learning Jaunsari as their mother tongue any longer. The Ethnologue reports otherwise.

In 2016, State Council of Educational Research and Training (SCERT) announced that Garhwali, Kumaoni, Jaunsari and Rang languages would be introduced on pilot basis for students in standard one to 10th in government schools Under the ‘Know Your Uttarakhand’ project.

References 

Northern Indo-Aryan languages
Endangered languages of India
Languages of Uttarakhand